John Jacob Dunnett (24 June 1922 – 26 October 2019) was a British Labour Party politician, solicitor, and football club chairman. He died in London in October 2019 at the age of 97.

Early life and politics

Dunnett was educated at Whitgift Middle School, Croydon, and Downing College, Cambridge, studying law. He served in World War II in the forces, first in as another rank in the Royal Fusiliers and then in the Cheshire Regiment from June 1941 – December 1946, reaching the rank of Captain. He took part in the invasion of Italy in September 1943 at Salerno. He was wounded in action near Cassino. After the war he returned to Cambridge, took his degree, and then qualified as a solicitor. He served as a councillor on Middlesex County Council 1958–61 and on Enfield Borough Council 1958–61, serving as an alderman until 1963. He was elected to the Greater London Council in 1964.

Dunnett was elected at the 1964 general election as Member of Parliament for Nottingham Central and held the seat until it was abolished in boundary changes for the 1974 election. He was then returned for the new Nottingham East constituency until the 1983 general election in which he did not stand; the seat then fell to the Conservatives. Dunnett had been elected to Parliament six times.

Football
Dunnett was Chairman of Brentford Football Club. In January 1967, following poor gates, he discussed a merger with Jim Gregory of Queens Park Rangers of the two clubs. This move threatened Brentford's independence and a consortium of businessmen and supporters of Brentford bought out Dunnett's shares to stave off proposed merger.  Subsequently, Queens Park Rangers won promotion to the First Division and then to the Premier League.

Dunnett was Chairman of Notts County from 1967, financing the club's regular annual losses by making interest free loans from his company, Park Street Securities. The Club paid a low rent to their landlords who were Nottingham Council. Dunnett inaugurated a fundraising scheme "life line" in 1986. Then in 1987, he stood down as Director and sold all his shares to Derek Pavis, completely severing his connection with the club. Under Dunnett's chairmanship, the club reached the then First Division, surviving for three years albeit with poor gates.

Dunnett was elected President of the Football League 1981–1986 and 1988–89, and was vice-president of the Football Association for the same period. He was a member of the Football Association's executive committee at the time of the Hillsborough disaster.

References 

 Times Guide to the House of Commons, 1966, 1979 and 1983 editions
 
 Who's Who 2013, pg. 663: DUNNETT, John Jacob, (Jack)

External links 
 

1922 births
2019 deaths
Alumni of Downing College, Cambridge
Labour Party (UK) MPs for English constituencies
Members of the Greater London Council
Councillors in Greater London
Councillors in the London Borough of Enfield
Presidents of the English Football League
UK MPs 1964–1966
UK MPs 1966–1970
UK MPs 1970–1974
UK MPs 1974
UK MPs 1974–1979
UK MPs 1979–1983
Brentford F.C. directors and chairmen
Notts County F.C. non-playing staff